The 4th Canadian Comedy Awards, presented by the Canadian Comedy Foundation for Excellence (CCFE), honoured the best live, television, and film comedy of 2002. The ceremony was held in 2003 in London, Ontario, concluding the three-day Canadian Comedy Awards Festival.  The ceremony was hosted by the Royal Canadian Air Farce.

Canadian Comedy Awards, also known as Beavers, were awarded in 19 categories. Winners were picked by members of ACTRA (Alliance of Canadian Cinema, Television and Radio Artists), the Canadian Actors' Equity Association, the Writers Guild of Canada, the Directors Guild of Canada, and the Comedy Association.

For the second consecutive year nominations were led by TV series Made in Canada with seven nominations, followed by the films Men with Brooms and Rub & Tug with six apiece.  Made in Canada and This Hour Has 22 Minutes each won two Beavers, as did Mike Myers for Goldmember.

Festival and ceremony

The Canadian Comedy Awards had been televised in 2000 and 2001, but due to a lack of sponsorship the broadcasts stopped in 2002 and the awards ceremony was scaled-back. In 2003 the Canadian Comedy Foundation for Excellence (CCFE) was incorporated as a non-profit to organize the awards and the accompanying Canadian Comedy Awards Festival, a three-day comedy festival held in London, Ontario.  The festival took advantage of having the nominees in sketch, stand-up and improv comedy together in one place, and showcase performances led up to the awards ceremony.

The 4th awards ceremony was hosted by the Royal Canadian Air Farce, who had been inducted into the Canadian Comedy Hall of Fame two years earlier.

Winners and nominees
Winners are listed first and highlighted in boldface:

Live

Television

Film

Multiple wins
The following people, shows, films, etc. received multiple awards

Multiple nominations
The following people, shows, films, etc. received multiple nominations

References

External links
Canadian Comedy Awards official website

Canadian Comedy Awards
Canadian Comedy Awards
Awards
Awards